Hyphorma is a genus of moths of the family Limacodidae.

Species
Hyphorma avanta Solovyev & Witt, 2009
Hyphorma capucina (Snellen, 1900)
Hyphorma flaviceps (Hampson, 1910)
Hyphorma margaritacea Hering, 1931 in Seitz
Hyphorma minax Walker, 1865
Hyphorma minor de Joannis, 1930
Hyphorma sericea Leech, 1899

References 

 , 2009: The Limacodidae of Vietnam. Entomofauna Supplement 16: 33-229.

Limacodidae genera
Limacodidae